Suuri-Onkamo is a medium-sized lake in the Vuoksi main catchment area. It is located in the North Karelia region. It is situated about 20 kilometer from the border with Russia. The lake is separated from another lake Pieni-Onkamo with nice esker called Sintsi. Third medium-sized lake near by is Särkijärvi. It has been said that compared to other Finnish lakes Suuri-Onkamo has different kind of climate, which comes from the lake Ladoga in the Russian side of the border.

See also
List of lakes in Finland

References

Lakes of Tohmajärvi